Cuneiform is an ancient writing system originating in Mesopotamia.

Cuneiform (from the Latin word for "wedge-shaped") may also refer to:
Cuneiform bones, in the human foot
Cuneiform cartilages, in the human larynx
Cuneiform Records, a music record label
CuneiForm (software), an optical character recognition tool
Cuneiform (Unicode block)
Cuneiform (programming language)